Terry Rocavert (born 21 October 1955) is a former professional tennis player from Australia.

Playing career
Rocavert is often known for his second round match against John McEnroe in the 1980 Wimbledon Championships. After defeating veteran Roger Taylor in the opening round, Rocavert faced the American and took a two sets to one lead. In the fourth set tiebreak, Rocavert went up a mini-break when McEnroe double faulted and recalled that he "started thinking of the consequences of winning, what they might ask me at the press conference". He lost the tiebreak and then the fifth set, 3–6.

He was a semi-finalist in the men's doubles at the 1979 Australian Open, with partner John James.

Rocavert was runner-up to Bob Lutz at the 1980 Columbus Open. En route to the final he defeated Ilie Năstase. He also made the semi-finals in Hobart that year.

Coaching
From 1980 to 1989, Rocavert was the New South Wales state coach. He now coaches in Birchgrove.

Family
He is the son of Don Rocavert, who competed at the Australian Championships in 1947 and 1951.

Grand Prix career finals

Singles: 1 (0–1)

References

1955 births
Living people
Australian male tennis players
Tennis people from New South Wales
20th-century Australian people